Ritola is a surname. Notable people with the surname include:

Ville Ritola (1896–1982), Finnish athlete
Mattias Ritola (born 1987), Swedish ice-hockey player
Matti Ritola (1902–1967), Finnish cross-country skier

Finnish-language surnames